Maspeth was a station along the Lower Montauk Branch of the Long Island Rail Road. The station was opened in February 1895 at 58th Avenue and Rust Street. The station closed in October 1903. It was reopened and closed again afterwards, dates between these years is unconfirmed, around 1924 the building was removed and around 1925 the station stop itself was discontinued. Currently the area is the site of freight activity by the New York and Atlantic Railway.

References

Former Long Island Rail Road stations in New York City
Maspeth, Queens
Railway stations in the United States opened in 1895
Railway stations closed in 1925
Railway stations in Queens, New York